Abgarm or Abegarm (also Romanized as Ābgarm, Āb-e Garm, and Āb Garm) is a city and capital of Abgarm District, in Buin Zahra County, Qazvin Province, Iran. Abgarm lies along Road 37, about 20 kilometres north by road from Avaj. At the 2006 census its population was 5,191, in 1,345 families.

References 

Avaj County
Cities in Qazvin Province